The Wz50 also known as M50 is a steel combat helmet used by Poland from its introduction in 1950 to its replacement by the Wz67 in 1967. The helmet would be widely exported to a number of Arab countries for its low price. Early pre-production helmets by a double riveted chinstrap and cow skin leather liner. All models of helmet would include an maker and manufacture stamp

Design 

The shell is another Warsaw Pact copy of the Soviet SSh-40 design, along with the Czech M53 and Hungarian M70, the liner and chinstrap was influenced by the Italian M33. The shell being painted a dark green color for the army and blue for the air force and navy. The liner is held in place by three rivets and based primarily off the Italian M33 helmet with its eight leather tongues, rivet placement along with the chin strap as well. Starting in 1962 branch specific stenciled insignia would be applied to the front. A variant for use by the civil defense was developed which featured a prominent crest on top and insignia on the side with its respective city.

Users

References

External links

 Poland Wz50 at brendonshelmets.weebly.com

Combat helmets of Poland
Military equipment introduced in the 1950s